Chmielów may refer to the following villages in Poland:

 Chmielów, Lower Silesian Voivodeship (south-west Poland)
 Chmielów, Lublin Voivodeship (east Poland)
 Chmielów, Subcarpathian Voivodeship (south-east Poland)
 Chmielów, Ostrowiec County in Świętokrzyskie Voivodeship (south-central Poland)
 Chmielów, Pińczów County in Świętokrzyskie Voivodeship (south-central Poland)